The 1994 Trans-Am Series was the 29th season of the Sports Car Club of America's Trans-Am Series.

Results

Championships

Drivers
Scott Pruett – 351 points
Ron Fellows – 307 points
Tommy Kendall – 276 points
Dorsey Schroeder – 276 points
Paul Gentilozzi – 271 points

Manufacturers
Ford – 109 points
Chevrolet – 90 points

References

Trans-Am Series
1994 in American motorsport
Trans-Am Series